The Guest is a 2017 Nigerian film produced and written by Foluke Olaniyi and directed by Christian Olayinka.

Plot
The film gives insight on how a married couple were enjoying their lovely marriage until a friend who is a lady is deported from England. She lived with them and causing havoc to their marriage by having an affair with the man.

Cast
 Rita Dominic
 Femi Jacobs
 Somkele Iyamah
 Chika Chukwu

References

Nigerian drama films
English-language Nigerian films
2017 films